Muratlı Dam is a dam on the Çoruh River in Muratlı village,  north east of Borçka in Artvin Province, Turkey. The development was backed by the Turkish State Hydraulic Works.

See also

Borçka Dam – upstream
List of dams and reservoirs in Turkey

References

Dams in Artvin Province
Hydroelectric power stations in Turkey
Dams on the Çoruh River
Dams completed in 2005